This list of motorsport championships is a list of national and international motorsport championships decided by the points or positions earned by a driver from multiple races.

Formula cars

Championship level:
 Formula One World Championship
 Super Formula  (formerly Japanese Formula 2000, Japanese Formula Two, Japanese Formula 3000, Formula Nippon)
 FIA Formula E World Championship
 IndyCar Series

FIA Pathway:

International
 FIA Formula 2 Championship
 FIA Formula 3 Championship
 FIA Formula 3 World Cup (2016–)

Regional
Formula Regional European Championship by Alpine - Formed by the merge of Formula Renault Eurocup & Formula regional Europe
Formula Regional Middle East Championship
Formula Regional Japanese Championship
Formula Regional Oceania Championship - Rebranded Toyota racing series in 2023
Formula Regional Americas Championship 
Formula Regional Indian Championship
Formula Regional Asian Championship - Inactive until effects of Covid are reduced in the region
W Series - Women only series

Non Fia national formula 3
GB3
Eurocup-3
Euroformula Open Championship

National (FIA Formula 4)
 1400cc
 Italian Formula 4 Championship (2014-)
 Spanish Formula 4 Championship (2016–)
 United Arab Emirates Formula 4 Championship (2016–)
 1600cc
 F4 British Championship (2015–)  (formerly MSA Formula)
 Australian Formula 4 Championship (2015–)
 NACAM Formula 4 Championship (2015–)
 2000cc
 F4 Japanese Championship (2015–)
 China Formula 4 Championship (2015–)
 Formula 4 United States Championship (2016–)
 South East Asia Formula 4 Championship (2016–)
 F4 Danish Championship (2017–)

Road to Indy

Defunct

 A1 Grand Prix (2005–2009)
 Formula Acceleration 1 (2014)
 Grand Prix Masters (2005–2006)
 Superleague Formula (2008–2011)
 GP2 Series (2005–2016)
 GP2 Asia Series (2008–2011)
 GP3 Series (2010-2018)
 Formula V8 3.5 Series (1998–2017)
 Formula 3000 International Championship (1985–2004)
 International Formula Master (2005-2009) (formerly 3000 Pro Series, F3000 International Masters)
 Auto GP (1999-2016) (formerly Italian Formula 3000, Euro Formula 3000, Euroseries 3000, Auto GP World Series, Auto GP Formula Open Championship
 Mexican Formula Two
 Australian Formula 2 Championship
 British Formula Two (formerly British Formula 3000)
 Australian Drivers' Championship (1957 to 2014)
 Formula Palmer Audi (1998–2010)
 Formula Rus
 Formula First
 Formula 5000
 Tasman Series
 Formula 2000
 Formula Mazda
 Formula Maruti
 Formula Vee
 Formula Super Vee
 Formula 4 Sudamericana
 Formula Toyota (1991–1999)
 Formula Suzuki Kei Sport
 Formula Suzuki Hayabusa
 Formula Challenge Japan
 Formula FJ
 Formula Dream
 Japan Formula 4
 FIA Historic Formula One Championship (formerly Thoroughbred Grand Prix Championship)
 FIA Masters Historic Formula One Championship
 British Formula One Championship (1978–1982)
 Skip Barber series
 Skip Barber National Championship (formerly Skip Barber Formula Dodge Series)
 Barber Dodge Pro Series (1986–2003, known as Barber Saab Pro Series between 1986–1994
 Formula Abarth (formerly Formula Azzurra) (2005-)
 Formula K (1980s and 1990s in México)
 Formula Masters China (2011-) (formerly Formula Pilota China)
 ADAC Formel Masters (2008-)
 Toyota Racing Series 
Formula Three
 500cc
 British Formula 3 Championship (1950–1962)
 German Formula Three Championship (1950–1953)
 Danish Formula Three Championship (1950–1965)
 Finnish Formula Three Championship (1958–1960)
 1000cc
 British Formula 3 Championship (1964–1970)
 French Formula Three Championship  (1964–1970)
 Italian Formula Three Championship (1964–1966, 1968–1970)
 Danish Formula Three Championship (1964–1966)
 Swedish Formula Three Championship (1964–1970)
 Belgian Formula Three Championship (1964–1967)
 Temporada F3 (1966–1971)
 1600cc
 British Formula 3 Championship (1971–1973)
 French Formula Three Championship (1971–1973)
 German Formula Three Championship (1971–1973)
 Italian Formula Three Championship (1971–1973)
 Swedish Formula Three Championship (1971–1973)
 2000cc
 FIA Formula 3 International Trophy (2011)
 FIA Formula 3 Intercontinental Cup (2012–2015)
 FIA European Formula Three Championship (1975–1984, 2012-2018)
 Formula Three Euroseries (2003–2012)
 FIA North European zone Formula 3 Championship (2008–20??)
 British Formula 3 Championship (1974–2014)
 Finnish Formula Three Championship (1984–1986, 2000–2010)
 French Formula Three Championship (1978–2002)
 German Formula Three Championship (1974–2002) (Polifac Trophy in 1974)
 ATS Formel 3 Cup (2003–2014)
 Italian Formula Three Championship (1974–2012)
 Russian Formula Three Championship (1997–2002, 2008
 Swedish Formula Three Championship (1974–1994,1997–2000)
 Danish Formula Three Championship (1976–1977)
 Norvegian Formula Three Championship (1999–2000)
 Nordic Formula Three Championship (1984–1985, 1992–2001)
 FIA central zone Formula 3 Championship (1994–2005)
 Polish Formula 3 Championship (1995)
 Tschechien Formula 3 Championship (1994–1995)
 Swiss Formula 3 Championship (1967–2008)
 Greek Formula 3 Championship (1990–2002)
 Turkish Formula 3 Championship (1994–2006)
 All-Japan Formula Three Championship (1979–2019)
 Asian Formula Three Championship (2001–2008)
 United States Formula Three Championship (2000–2001)
 Formula Three Sudamericana (1987–2013)
 Mexican Formula Three Championship (1990–2002)
 Brazilian Formula Three Championship (1990–1994, 2014–)
 Australian Formula 3 Championship (2001 to 2015)

 ADAC Formula 4 (2015–)
 SMP F4 Championship (2015–)

IndyCar
 IndyCar
 American Automobile Association (1909–1955)
 United States Automobile Club 
National Championship (1956–1978)
USAC Mini Indy (Formula Super Vee 1977–1980)
 Championship Auto Racing Teams (1978–2001)
 Indy Lights (formerly American Racing Series) (1986–2003)
 Champ Car World Series (2004–2008)
 Atlantic Championship (formerly Toyota Atlantic, Formula Atlantic, Formula Pacific, Formula Mondial 1974–2009
 IndyCar

 Indy Lights (formerly Infiniti/Indy Pro Series founded, 2002)
 Pro Mazda Championship (1991-) (formerly Star Mazda Championship

Speedway
 Oval Superstars Tour
 Sprint car racing
All Star Circuit of Champions
National Sprint Tour (2006)
World of Outlaws
World Series Sprintcars
Lucas Oil ASCS Sprint Car Series
United States Auto Club
 USAC Silver Crown Series 
 USAC Sprint Car National Championship
 USAC National Midget Series
 USCS
 KWSS
 UMS
 POWRi
 Northeastern Midget Association
 Empire Super Sprint

Hillclimb
 Hillclimb
 FIA European Hill Climb Championship
 FIA International Hill Climb Cup
 FIA Hill Climb Masters
 British Hill Climb Championship
 Championnat de France de la Montagne
 All Japan Dirt Trial Championship
 FIA Historic Hill-Climb
 Speed Hill Italian Championships (Campionato italiano velocità montagna)
 Pikes Peak International Hillclimb

Kart
 World Superkart Championship (1983–1995)
 European Superkart Championship (1967–1995, 2002–)
 Australian Superkart Championship (1989–)
 British Superkart Championship
 Master de Pilotos
 Karting World Championship

Off-road racing
 Off-road racing
 Short Course Off Road Racing
 Lucas Oil Off Road Racing Series (2009–2020)
 TORC: The Off-Road Championship (2009–2018)
 Championship Off-Road Racing (1998–2008)
 World Series of Off-Road Racing (2007–2008)
 SODA (? – 1997/1998?)
 Mid America Off Road Association (MAORA)
 Stadium Off Road Racing
 Mickey Thompson Entertainment Group (1983–1994)
 Stadium Super Trucks (2013–)
 USHRA/ PACE Motorsports Off Road Championships (1998–1999)
 Desert Off Road Racing
 Valley Off Road Racing Association (VORRA) (1975–present) 
 SCORE International
 Best in the Desert
 Southern Nevada Off Road Enthusiasts (SNORE)
 Mojave Desert Racing (MDR)
 Mojave Off Road Enthusiasts (MORE)
 Extreme Off-Road
 Formula Off-Road

Rally car
 Rallying
 World Rally Championship (since 1973)
 Junior World Rally Championship (JWRC)
 Production World Rally Championship (PWRC)
 African Rally Championship
 Asia Cross Country Rally (AXCR) (since 1996)
 Asia-Pacific Rally Championship
 Australian Rally Championship
 British Rally Championship
 Canadian Rally Championship
 China Rally Championship
 European Rally Championship
 Finnish Rally Championship
 France Rally Championship
 German Rally Championship
 Indian National Rally Championship
 Intercontinental Rally Challenge (since 2006)
 Irish Tarmac Rally Championship
 All Japan Rally Championship
 Malaysian Rally Championship
 Portugal Rally Championship
 Scottish Rally Championship
 Spanish Rally Championship
 Rally Mobil
 Russian Rally Championship
 Rally America National Championship
 United States Rally Championship
 Supercar Rally
 SCCA ProRally (1973–2004)
 FIA Historic Rally Championships
 Rally raid
 Dakar Rally
 Dakar Series (2008 first event, series since 2009)
 FIA Cross Country Rally World Cup
 Africa Eco Race
 TSD rally (Time, Speed, Distance)
 Historic Rally Championship
 Rally VHC
 Rally VHC French Cup

Rallycross
Rallycross
 FIA World Rallycross Championship
 FIA European Rallycross Championship
 Embassy/ERA European Rallycross Championship (1973–1975)
 National Series
 British Rallycross Championship 
 BTRDA Clubmans Rallycross Championship 
 Championnat de France Rallycross 
 Global Rallycross Championship 

One-Design
 2cv Cross (since 1974, non-championship races in 1972 and 1973)
 International 2cv Cross championship
 Coupe de France de 2cv Cross (since 1974) 
 Series and races held also in Austria, Italia, Great-Britain, Portugal, Spain, Switzerland and Netherlands.

Ice racing
Ice racing
 Andros Trophy (since 1990)
 Sports Car Racing on Ice (by the International Ice Racing Association (IIRA))
 Ice Super Star Racing (ISSR) (since 2008–09)

Sports car racing

Prototype and GT categories

FIA World Endurance Championship (2012–Present) Hypercar (LMDh/LMH), LMP2, LMP3, LMGTE (GT3 From 2024)
WeatherTech SportsCar Championship (2014–Present) GTD (LMDh/LMH), LMP2, LMP3, GT3 (Split into Sprint and Endurance sub championships)

European Le Mans Series (2004-Present) LMP2, LMP3, GTE
GT3 Le Mans Cup (2016-Present) LMP3, GT3 (ELMS feeder series)
Asian Le Mans Series (2009-Present) LMP2, LMP3, GT3
2023 VP Racing SportsCar Challenge (2023-Present) LMP3, GT4 (WeatherTech SportsCar Championship Feeder series)

Other active LMP3 and GT combined series
2022 GT & Prototype Challenge 
Road to Le Mans (2016-Present) (one-off event)
DTM Endurance (Starting 2023) - comprising LMP3 2022 Prototype Cup Germany and GT3 ADAC GT Masters

GT3
Deutsche Tourenwagen Masters (2000-Present) GT3 Formerly a Touring car championship before transitioning to GT3 spec in 2021
Super GT (1993-Present) GT300/GT3, GT500 - (formerly Japanese GT Championship)

Intercontinental GT Challenge (2016-Present) GT3
GT World Challenge Australia (1960-Present) GT3, GT4 Started out as the Australian GT championship
GT World Challenge Asia (2017-Present) GT3
GT World Challenge Europe Consists of; 
GT World Challenge Europe Sprint Cup (2013-Present) GT3 (Formerly the Blancpain Sprint Series)
GT World Challenge Europe Endurance Cup (2011-Present) GT3 (Formerly the Blancpain Endurance Series)
GT World Challenge America (2016-Present) GT3

GT3 and GT4 entries
Super Taikyu Series (1991-Present) GT3, GT4, TC
British GT Championship (1993-Present) GT3, GT4
24H Series (2006-Present) Includes the Main series & the 2022–23 Middle East Trophy GT3, GT4, GTX, Porsche 911 and 992 as of 2022
24 Hours of Nürburgring (1 off event)
Italian GT (2003-Present) GT3, GT4

GT Opens (open to multiple specifications)
International GT Open (2006-Present) Mostly GT3
GT Cup Open Europe (2019-Present) Mostly GT3, GT4
Supercar Challenge (series) (2001-Present)

Notable GT4 series
GT4 European Series (2007-Present) GT4
Michelin Pilot Challenge (1997-Present)  GT4, TC
FFSA GT Championship (1997-Present) GT4
ADAC GT4 Germany (2019-Present) GT4
Pirelli GT4 America Series (2019-Present) GT4

Other
Nürburgring Endurance Series (1977-Present)
GT2 European Series (2015-Present) series is for "Gentleman Drivers"

Defunct

IMSA Prototype Challenge (IMSA Lites 2006-2016) (IMSA Prototype challenge 2017-2022)Became VP Racing SportsCar Challenge in 2023
American Le Mans Series (1999-2013) Merged with Rolex Sports Car Series to become WeatherTech SportsCar Championship 
Rolex Sports Car Series (2000-2013) Merged with American Le Mans Series to become WeatherTech SportsCar Championship 
 World Sportscar Championship (1953–1992)
 FIA Sportscar Championship (1998–2003)
Intercontinental Le Mans Cup (2010–2011)
 IMSA GT Championship (1971–1998)
 LMP3 Championship Cup
FIA GT Series (2013)
FIA GT1 World Championship (2010-2012)
FIA GT Championship (Until 2009)
 FIA GT2 European Cup (2010 only)
 FIA GT3 European Championship (2006-2012)
 GT Asia Series (Until 2017)
 Intercontinental GT Challenge
 Australian Sports Car Championship (1969–1988)
 Deutsche Rennsport Meisterschaft (1972–1985)
 ADAC Supercup (1985–1989)
 Interserie
 USRRC (1963–1968, 1998)
 All Japan Sports Prototype Championship (1983–1992)
 Fuji Grand Champion series (1971–1989)
 Japan Le Mans Challenge (2006–2007)
 Belcar (2007-Present)
 Campeonato Brasileiro de GT
 FIA GT Championship
 FIA GT3 European Championship
 Spanish GT
 BPR Global GT Series (1994–1996)
 BRDC C2 Championship (1988–1990)
 Can-Am (1966–1974, 1977–1986)
 Superstars Series (2004–2013)
 GTR Euroseries (1998)
 Trans-Am Series (1966–2005)

Stock car

NASCAR
 NASCAR
Cup Series
 Xfinity Series
 Gander RV & Outdoors Truck Series
 ARCA Menards Series
 ARCA Menards Series East
 ARCA Menards Series West
 Pinty's Series (formerly the CASCAR Super Series)
 PEAK Mexico Series (formerly the MasterCard Truck Series, Desafío Corona)
Whelen Euro Series (formerly the Racecar Euro-Series)
Whelen Modified Tour
Weekly Racing Series
ISCARS Dash Touring Series (formerly the NASCAR Goody's Dash Series, IPOWER Dash Series)
SRL Southwest Tour (formerly the NASCAR AutoZone Elite Division, Southwest Series)
Stock V6 Series (formerly Reto Neon Series, T4 Series, Mini Stock Series, Mexico Pro Series)
Australian Superspeedway Series (1986–2001)
AutoZone Elite Division, Midwest Series (formerly the ARTGO Challenge Series) (1975–2006)
AutoZone Elite Division, Northwest Series (1985–2006)
AutoZone Elite Division, Southeast Series (1991–2006)
Grand American (1968–1971)
Grand National East Series (1972–1973)
Toyota All-Star Showdown (2003–2011)
Whelen Southern Modified Tour (formerly the SMART Modified Tour) (1989–2016)

Other asphalt stock cars
 American Speed Association
 ASA Late Model Series
Automobile Racing Club of America
ARCA Midwest Tour (formerly ASA Midwest Tour)
ARCA Lincoln Welders Truck Series
 Champion Racing Association
 CRA Super Series
 CARS Tour
 Camaro Cup
 Hot Rods (oval racing)
 Days of Thunder Racing Series
 Pickup Truck Racing
 Turismo Carretera
 Mid-American Stock Car Series
 Arena Racing USA 
 European Late Model Series
 American Stock Car Challenge
 IMCA Modified
 American Canadian Tour
 Allison Legacy Series
 Pro All Stars Series
 AUSCAR (1987–1999)
 International Race of Champions (IROC) (1974–2006)
 Speedcar Series (2008–2009)
 VSR V8 Trophy (formerly ASCAR, Stock Car Speed Association) (2001–2008) 
 United Auto Racing Association (2002–2013)

Other dirt stock cars
 Lucas Oil Late Model Dirt Series
 World of Outlaws Late Model Series
 United Midwestern Promoters (UMP)
 International Motor Contest Association (IMCA)
 O'Reilly All Star Late Model Series
 Southern United Professional Racing
 British Stock Car Association
 BriSCA Formula 1 Stock Cars World Championship
 BriSCA Formula 2 Stock Cars
 United Late Model Series
 WISSOTA AMSOIL Dirt Track Series 
 NCRA
 USRA

Touring car
 Touring car racing
 World Touring Car Cup (formerly World Touring Car Championship)
 European Touring Car Championship (1963–1988, 2000–2004)
 Deutsche Tourenwagen Masters (2000–present)
 International Touring-Car Championship (1995–1996)
 Deutsche Tourenwagen Meisterschaft (1984–1994)
 Supercars Championship
 British Touring Car Championship
 British Saloon Car Championship (1958–1986)
 Swedish Touring Car Championship
 Japanese Touring Car Championship (1985–1998)
 Championnat de France de Supertourisme (1976–2005)
 Australian Touring Car Championship (1969 to 1998) (Held as a single race championship 1960 to 1968)
 Supercars Championship (Held as Shell Championship Series 1999 to 2001, V8 Supercar Championship Series 2002 to 2010, International V8 Supercars Championship 2011 to 2015, Supercars Championship from 2016 to date)
 Australian Manufacturers' Championship (1971–1994)
 Australian Championship of Makes (1976–1980)
 Australian Endurance Championship (1981–1991)
 Australian 2.0 Litre Touring Car Championship (1986, 1987 & 1993)
 Australian Super Touring Championship (1995 to 2000/2001)
 Australian Sports Sedan Championship (1976 to 2003)
 Portuguese Velocity Championship
 South African Touring Car Championship
 South African Modified Saloon Car Championship
 Italia Superturismo Championship
 Champion de Belgique Procar
 South American Super Touring Car Championship
 South East Asian Touring Car Challenge (1996–1999)
 Spanish Touring Car Championship
 Central-European Super Touring Championship
 New Zealand V8s (formerly New Zealand Touring Car Championship)
 V8 SuperTourer
 NZV8s Development Series (2004/05-2007/08) 
 TC 2000
 Super Tourenwagen Cup (1994–1999)
 Asia-Pacific Touring Car Championship (1988, 1994)
 South Pacific Touring Car Championship (1986)
 North American Touring Car Championship (1996–1997)
 Stock Car Brasil
 ADAC Procar Series, (formerly ''DMSB-Produktionswagen-Meisterschaft)
 Danish Touring Car Championship
 Russian Touring Car Championship
 Finnish Touring Car Championship
 Dutch Supercar Challenge
 Castrol-Haugg-Cup (CHC) entry-level series on Germany's Nürburgring
 Hong Kong Touring Car Championship
 Asian Touring Car Championship
 Philippine Touring Car Championship (formerly the PNTCC)
 China Touring Car Championship
 National Auto Sport Association
 Production car racing
 Australian Production Car Championship (1987–2002, 2005–)
 V8 Utes
 BNT V8 Utes 
 Super Taikyu
 Britcar
 TCR International Series
 SPEED World Challenge
 IMSA Bridgestone Supercar Championship (1991–1995
 Castrol Canadian Touring Car Championship
 Carbonia Cup
 Optima Batteries ChumpCar World Series
 24 Hours of LeMons
 United States Touring Car Championship

Drag racing
 National Hot Rod Association series
 NHRA Full Throttle series
 Top Fuel
 Funny Car
 Pro Stock
 Pro Stock Motorcycle
 Competition Eliminator
 Super Comp
 Super Gas
 Super Stock
 Super Pro ET
 Pro ET
 Sportsman ET
 Junior Dragster
 Lucas Oil Drag Racing Series
 NHRA Xplōd Sport Compact Racing Series
 National Import Racing Association (199?–2001)
 International Hot Rod Association
 Top Fuel
 Pro Stock
 Australian Drag Racing Championship
 Top Doorslammer
 Nordic Super Cup Championships
 Japan Drag Racing Association Championship
 Japan Dragrace Driver Association
 BERC Dragracing Championship
 Jamaica Drag Racing Association
 NOPI Drag Racing Association
 NOPI XBox Cup (formerly NOPI Race Wars)
 FIA European Drag Racing Championships
 FIA Top Fuel
 FIA Top Methanol
 FIA Top Methanol Funny Car
 FIA Pro Stock
 FIA/MSA Pro Modified
 PMRA
 ADRL
 Souped UP Thailand Records

Drifting
 Drifting
 D1 Grand Prix 
 D1 Street Legal
 Formula D 
 MSC Challenge 
 D1NZ 
 European Drift Championship 
 D1UK (2002–2003)
 Autoglym Drift Championship (2004–2005)
 D1GB (2006)
 King of Europe ProSeries (2005-) 
 ProDrift European Series 
 ProDrift Irish Series 
 D1IRL (?-2005)
Drift Mania Canadian Championship 
Drift Australia 
Nordic Drifting Championship
Toyo Drift Malaysia Series 
 D1MY (2006)
DDGT 
Czech Drift Series (2010–present) 
Drift Masters Grand Prix (2015-2017) 
Drift Masters European Championship (2018–present) (formerly Drift Masters GP)
Driftingowe Mistrzostwa Polski (2010–present)

One-make manufacturer racing

 One-make racing
 Alfa Romeo series
 Trofeo Europa Alfasud 
 Alfa Romeo GTV Cup
 European Alfa 147 Challenge 
 Aston Martin Asia Cup
 Austin/MG/Rover series
 MGF Cup ( 1997–2000,  ?-?,  ?-?,  ?-? (consisting of tarmac rallies and hillclimbs))
 Dunlop Rover Turbo Cup ( -1996)
 Rover 200 Cup
 MG Metro Challenge ( 1980s)
 BMW series
 BMW M1 Procar Championship ( 1979–1980)
 BMW 130i Cup 
 MINI Challenge 
 Super Mini Challenge 
 Caterham series
 Caterham Graduates Racing Club 
 Avon Tyres Caterham Superlight Challenge 
 Motorsport News Caterham Roadsport Challenge 
 The Circuit Driver Caterham Academy ( also consists sprints and hillclimbs races)
 evo Caterham Eurocup 
 Corvette Challenge ( 1988–1989)
 DC Avanti Cup 
 Dodge Ram 1500 Challenge
 Ferrari Challenge
 Trofeo Pirelli (Professional)
 Italia 
 Europa 
 North America 
 Asia-Pacific 
 Coppa Shell (Amateur)
 Italia 
 Europa 
 North America 
 Asia-Pacific 
 Finali Mondiali (Ferrari Challenge World Championship Race in /) 
 Dunlop Fiat Punto Abarth Cup
 Fuji Freshman series ( 1970s-?)
 Ginetta series 
 Ginetta GT Supercup 
 Ginetta GT5 Challenge 
 GRDC - Ginetta G40 
 GRDC+ - Ginetta G40 
 Ginetta Junior Championship 
 Ginetta Junior Championship Winter Series 
 Honda
 Honda N-One Owner's Cup   
 Honda Fit 1.5 Challenge Cup  
 Honda CRX Championship  (1988-199?)
 Honda Jazz ASEAN Challenge 
 Honda City Hatchback One Make Race  
 Hyundai 
 Copa Hyundai HB20 
 Hyundai N Festival  
 Hyundai Avante N Cup (Racing Modified)
 Hyundai Avante N Line Cup (Stock)
 Hyundai Veloster N Cup
 Lambo Diablo Supertrophy  (1996–1999)
 Autobytel Lotus Exige Trophy  (2000-200?)
 Trofeo Maserati 
 Ghibli Open Cup (1992–1995)
 Maserati Grantrofeo (1993–1994)
 Maserati Trofeo  Maserati 3200
 Mazda
 Mazda MX-5 Cup ( 1990–1991)
 North Island Mazda Rotary Series 
 Mitsubishi series
 Mitsubishi Mirage Cup ( 1986 – 1993,  1999–?)
 Mitsubishi Lancer Cup ( 1999–?) ( 2013-2016)
 Nissan series
 Saurus Cup (1990s)
 March Cup 
 Z Challenge 
 Super Silvia series (1990s)
 Peugeot 207 Spider Cup
 Peugeot RC Cup (2002–2006)
 Panoz Racing Series 
 Women's Global GT Series (1999–2000)
 Porsche series
 Porsche Championship 
 Porsche Supercup (1993–present)
 Porsche Cup Brazil  
 Porsche Carrera Cup France  (1987–present)
 Porsche Carrera Cup Germany  (1986–present)
 Porsche Carrera Cup Great Britain  (2003–present)
 Porsche Carrera Cup Scandinavia  (2004–present)
 Porsche Carrera Cup Italy  (2007–present)
 Porsche Carrera Cup Australia  (2003–2008)
 Porsche Carrera Cup Japan 
 Porsche Carrera Cup Asia 
 Porsche Sports Cup Scandinavia 
 944 Turbo Cup (1986–1988)
 IMSA GT3 Cup Challenge
 Radical series
 Radical World Cup
Radical European Masters  
Radical North American Masters 
 Radical Powertec Challenge
 Dunlop Radical Enduro Championship ( 2000–2007)
 Dunlop Radical Biduro Championship ( 1999–2007)
 British Radical Cup 
 Radical Clubmans Cup
 Gulf Radical Cup (Middle East)
 Radical German Racecup 
 Swedish Radical Cup 
 Swedish Endurance Cup 
 Radical Challenge Portugal 
 Italian Radical Cup (IPS) 
Radical Cup Canada 
 Radical Cup West 
 Radical Cup East 
 Radical Nevada Series 
Radical Cup China 
 Copa Radical Llantas Continental Latinoamérica
 Renault series

 Renault Eurocup
 Championnat Européen de Formule Renault (1974)
 Coupe d’Europe Renault 5 LS (1975–1976)
 Coupe d'Europe Renault 5 Alpine (1977–1980)
 Coupe d'Europe Renault 5 Turbo (1981–1984)
 Europa Cup Renault Alpine V6 Turbo (1985–1988)
 Europa Cup Renault 21 Turbo (1989–1990)
 Europa Cup Renault Clio (1991–1995)
 Renault Sport Spider Elf Trophy (1996–1998)
 Renault Sport Clio Trophy (1999–2004)
 Eurocup Mégane Trophy (since 2005)
 Renault Cup
 Renault Clio Cup Belux (since 2008) 
 Renault Sport Clio Cup Elf Belgium (2001–2007) 
 Renault Clio Cup Brazil (since 2002?) 
 Clio Cup México (since 2003) 
 Casinoportalen Clio Cup Renault Denmark 
 LO Renault New Clio Cup Suisse 
 Copa Megane Argentina (since 2000) 
 Elf Renault Clio Cup United Kingdom 
 Renault 5 Cup (late 1970s–1993)
 Spider Trophy (1996–1999)
 Copa Renault Clio España 
 Renault Clio Cup France 
 Renault Clio Cup Germany 
 Renault Clio Cup Italia 
 Renault Clio Cup Turkey 
 Renault Clio Cup Netherlands 
 Renault Clio Cup Slovenia 
 Renault Clio Cup Scandinavia
 IMSA Renault Cup ( 1982–1985)
 Dacia Logan Cup
 Cupa Dacia Logan JOE Romania 
 Renault Super Clio Cup Brazil 
 Renault Clio V6 Cup
 Renault Clio V6 Cup Germany 
 Saab Turbo Mobil Challenge (1987–1988)
 SEAT series
 Supercopa SEAT León 
 SEAT Cupra Challenge 
 Škoda Auto series
 MATADOR Skoda Pick-up Cup 
 Suzuki series
 Swift Sport Cup 
 Suzuki Swift Cup 
 Suzuki Swift Sport Cup 
 Toyota series
 Toyota Finance 86 Championship 
 TOYOTA GAZOO Racing GR86/BRZ Cup (Japan) 
 TOYOTA GAZOO Racing GR86 Cup North America  
 Toyota Yaris Cup 
 Net'z Cup  (1999–2011)
 Corolla Sprinter Cup  (?-?)
 Vitz Cup 
 Toyota Vios One Make Series  (as Vios Cup)  (as Vios Challenge)
 TVR Tuscan Challenge 
 Vauxhall Vectra Challenge 
 Volkswagen series
 Volkswagen Racing Cup 
 ADAC New Beetle Cup
 ADAC Volkswagen Polo Cup 
 ADAC Volkswagen Lupo Cup (1998–2003)
 Golf Cup 
 Lupo Cup 
 Polo Cup 
 TDI Cup 
 Engen Volkswagen Cup 
 Westfield Sportscar Championship

Time Trial or Time Attack Racing
 Global Time Attack (GTA)
 GTA Pro Championship
 GTA Pro Am
 World Time Attack Challenge (WTAC)
 WTAC Clubsprint
 WTAC Open Class
 WTAC Pro Am Class
 WTAC Pro Class

Motorcycles

Road racing
 Grand Prix motorcycle racing
 MotoGP World Championship
 Moto2 World Championship
 Moto3 World Championship
 Superbike World Championship
 Supersport World Championship
 Superstock 1000cc Cup
 Superstock 600cc Cup
 Sidecar World Championship
 Endurance World Championship
 Endurance World Cup
 Red Bull MotoGP Rookies Cup
 Honda Thailand Talent Cup
 European Road Racing Championship
 ICGP UEM Cup
 Supermono UEM Cup
 British Superbike Championship
 British Supersport Championship
 British Superstock Championship
 AMA American Superbike Championship
 AMA Daytona Superbike Championship
 AMA Supersport Championship
 AMA Moto-GT Championship
 All Japan Road Race Championship
 Parts Canada Superbike Championship
 Irish Road Racing Championship
 Australian Superbike Championship 
 Championnat de France Superbike
 China Superbike Championship 
 Philippine Superbike Championship
 Campeonato Español de Velocidad
 CIV Superbike 
 IDM Superbike
 CitiBike Motorcycle Championship
 New Zealand Road Race Championship
 Dutch Superbike Kampioenschap
 Campeonato GP Colombia Cassarella de Motovelocidad

Motocross
 FIM Motocross World Championship
 AMA Motocross Championship
 Sidecarcross World Championship

Supercross
 FIM Supercross World Championship
 AMA Supercross
 AMA Supercross Lites
 Men's Moto X Super X
 Women's Moto X Super X
 Moto X Adaptive

Freestyle motocross
 Red Bull X-Fighters
 Freestyle motocross at the X Games
Moto X Step Up
Moto X Best Trick
Moto X Freestyle

Supermoto
 Moto X SuperMoto

Arenacross
 AMA Arenacross
 AMA Arenacross Lites

Motorcycle speedway
 Speedway World Championship
 Individual Speedway Australian Championship
 Australian Under 16 Solo Speedway Championship
 Australian Under 21 Solo Speedway Championship
 Australian Sidecar Speedway Championship
 Australian Under 16 Teams Speedway Championship
 Australian Under 16 Sidecar Speedway Championship
 Australian 350cc Junior Speedway Championship
 Speedway Swedish Individual Championship
 British Speedway Championship
 Individual Speedway Danish Championship
 Individual Speedway Polish Championship
 Speedway World Cup
 Team Speedway Junior World Championship
 AMA National Speedway Championship

Ice speedway
 Individual Ice Racing World Championship
 Team Ice Racing World Championship
 Individual Ice Racing European Championship
 Individual Junior Ice Racing European Championship

Truck racing
 Truck racing
 FIA European Truck Racing Championship 
 Fórmula Truck 
 National Series
 Coupe de France de Camion 
 Coupe de France de Camion Cross 
 British Truck Racing Championship
 New Zealand Super Truck 
 Russian Truck Racing Championship 
 British Truck Racing Association Championship

Water surface racing
 H1 Unlimited
 F1 Powerboat World Championship
 Class 1 World Powerboat Championship
 Super Boat
 Offshore Super Series
 UIM Powerboat GPS World Championship
Powerboat P1 World Championship (2003-2009)

Aircraft sport
 Red Bull Air Race World Championship
 FAI World Aerobatic Championships
 FAI World Grand Prix
 FAI European Aerobatic Championships

Radio-controlled racing

1:8 Sport On-Road
 IFMAR 1:8 IC Track World Championship (1977-)
 ROAR 1:8 On-road Fuel National Championship (1968-)
 EFRA 1:8 IC European Championship (1974-)
 Campionato Italiano Pista 1:8 (1971-)
 Championnat de France 1:8 piste (1975-)
 Deutsche Meisterschaften Verbrenner Glattbahn 1:8 (1971-)
 BRCA 1:8 Circuit Championship (1971-)
 JMRCA All-Japan 1:8 GP On-Road Championship (1978-)
 Campeonato de España de 1:8 Pista Gas (1980-)
 AARCMCC 1:8 IC On-Road National Championship (1979-)
 FEMCA Asia On-Road GP Championship (-)
Copa Sudamericana e Copa FAMAR de 1:8 Pista Gas (2010-)
Copa Sudamericana de 1:8 Pista Gas (-)
 Campeonato Brasileiro 1:8 Pista
 SARDA On-Road Gas National Championship
 Hong Kong On-Road GP Championship
 RCCA Nitro On-road Thailand Championships
  (2013—)

1:10 Electric Off-Road
Include championships for stadium and short course trucks
1:10 radio-controlled off-road buggy
IFMAR 1:10 Electric Off-Road World Championship (1985—)
 ROAR 1:10 Electric Off-Road National Championship (1984—) 
 JMRCA All-Japan 1:10 EP Off-Road Championship (1986—) 
 EFRA European 1:10 Off-Road Championship (1985—) 
 BRCA 1:10 Scale Electric Off-Road Championship (1989—) 
 Championnat de France 1:10 tout-terrain (1984—) 
 Deutsche Meisterschaften Elektro Off-road 1:10 (1984—) 
 AAMRCMCC 1:10 EP Off-Road National Championship (—) 
Campeonato de España de 1:10 Todo Terreno Eléctricos (—) 
 FEMCA Asia 1:10 Off-Road EP Championship (—)
  (2011—)

1:8 Off-Road
Also includes championships for truggies and ebuggies (electric buggies)
 IFMAR 1:8 IC Off-Road World Championship (1986-)
 EFRA European 1:8 IC Off-Road Championship (1979-)
 ROAR 1:8 Fuel Off-Road National Championship (1997-)
 FEMCA 1:8 Off-Road Championship (1986-)
 JMRCA All-Japan 1:8 GP Off-Road Championship (1980-)
 BRCA Rallycross Championship (1983-)
 Deutsche Meisterschaften Verbrenner Offroad 1:8 (1982-)
 Championnat de France 1:8 tout-terrain (1983-)
 Campeonato de España de 1:8 Todo Terreno Gas (1983-)
 Campionato Italiano Buggy 1:8 (1991-)
 RCCA Nitro Off-road Thailand Championships
 Nordic Championships – 1:8 Buggy (1986-)
 Copa Sudamericana e Copa FAMAR de 1:8 Todo Terreno Gas (2010-)
 AARCMCC 1:8 Scale IC Off-Road National Championship (1979-)
Copa Sudamericana de 1:8 Todo Terreno Gas (2003-2009)
 Campeoes Brasileiros FEBARC – 1:8 Off Road (19?-)
 SARDA Off-Road Gas National Championship
 RCACR 1:8 Off-Road Championship
 Israel League

1:10 Electric Touring Car
 IFMAR ISTC World Championship (1998-)
 EFRA European 1:10 Electric Touring Cars Championship
JMRCA All-Japan 1:10 Scale EP Touring Car Championship – Super Expert (2007-)
JMRCA All-Japan 1:10 Scale EP Touring Car Championship – Expert (1996-2006)
 Deutsche Meisterschaften Elektro Glattbahn Tourenwagen 1:10 (1997-)
 FEMCA Asian 1:10 ISTC Championship
 ROAR 1:10 Scale Electric On-Road Paved Sedan National Championship (-)
 ROAR 1:10 Scale On-Road Carpet Sedan National Championship (-)
 BRCA 1:10 Scale Electric Circuit Championship (-)
 RCCA Thailand On-Road Championships
 NOMAC Nederlands Kampioenschap Electro Circuit 1:10 – Toerwagens
 AARCMCC 1:10 Scale Electric Touring Car Championship
 AMSCI Campionato Italiano 1:10 Touring Elettrico (197?-)
 Campeonato Brasileiro 1:10 On Road
 SARDA On-Road Electric National Championship
 China National 1:10 Touring Car Championships
  (2007—)

1:12 On-Road
IFMAR 1:12 Electric Track World Championship (1982-)
ROAR Electric On-Road National Championship (1979-)
JMRCA All-Japan 1:12 EP Racing Championship (1982-)
EFRA 1:12 On-Road European Championship
BRCA 1:12 Electric Circuit National Championship

1:10 200mm Nitro Touring Car
  (2011—)

(1:5) Large Scale On-Road

PRO 10
IFMAR PRO 10 World Championship (1992-2000)

1:10 235mm On-Road
IFMAR 1:10 235mm On-Road World Championship (2000-2002)

(1:6) Large Scale Off-Road
 EFRA European Large Scale Off-Road Championship (2010-)

Other
 Tractor pulling
 U.S. Hot Rod Association Monster Jam monster trucks+

See also
 Auto racing
 Air racing
 Motorcycle racing
 Motorboat racing

References

External links
 Championship Winners 1950–1979
 FIA
 FIM
 FAI
 UIM
 IFMAR

 
Championships